Robert Grant Adkins (February 17, 1917 – December 6, 1997) was an American football blocking back, defensive end, guard and linebacker in the National Football League who played for the Green Bay Packers.  Adkins played collegiate ball for Marshall University and professionally in the NFL for 3 seasons.

References

External links

1917 births
1997 deaths
People from Letart, West Virginia
Players of American football from West Virginia
American football defensive ends
American football running backs
American football offensive guards
American football linebackers
Marshall Thundering Herd football players
Green Bay Packers players
United States Army personnel of World War II
United States Army soldiers